University Peak may refer to:

 University Peak (Alaska) in Alaska, USA
 University Peak (California) in California, USA
 University Peak (Antarctica)